Sybra incana is a species of beetle in the family Cerambycidae. It was described by Pascoe in 1859. It is known from Moluccas and Papua New Guinea.

References

incana
Beetles described in 1859